Christophe Épalle (born 23 January 1969 in Saint-Etienne) is a French hammer thrower, whose personal best throw is 81.79 metres, achieved in June 2000 in Clermont-Ferrand.

Achievements

External links

1969 births
Living people
French male hammer throwers
Athletes (track and field) at the 1992 Summer Olympics
Athletes (track and field) at the 1996 Summer Olympics
Athletes (track and field) at the 2000 Summer Olympics
Olympic athletes of France
Sportspeople from Saint-Étienne
SMU Mustangs men's track and field athletes
Universiade medalists in athletics (track and field)
Mediterranean Games gold medalists for France
Mediterranean Games medalists in athletics
Athletes (track and field) at the 1997 Mediterranean Games
Universiade bronze medalists for France
Medalists at the 1993 Summer Universiade